The Australian Nations Cup Championship was a motor racing title sanctioned by the Confederation of Australian Motor Sport (CAMS) from 2000 to 2004.

History
In the absence of the Australian GT Championship (which had not been run since 1985), Nations Cup became the top CAMS sanctioned championship in Australia for GT style cars. It evolved from the GT Production category, which was created in 1995 by category managers PROCAR Australia. For 2000, PROCAR split the Australian GT Production Car Championship into two separate series so that the more exotic GT cars such as Porsche 911s, Ferrari 360s and Lamborghini Diablo's could compete in the new Australian Nations Cup Championship and the lesser vehicles such as the Mitsubishi Lancers, Subaru Imprezas and HSV's could now compete for outright wins in the revised Australian GT Production Car Championship.

Cars
The cars that regularly competed in the Nations Cup Championships included:

All cars in the Nations Cup Championship were required to use the engines that came with the various road going models, with the exception of the Holden Monaro. In 2002 in an effort to have an Australian car manufacturer competing in the top category and to have them competitive rather than just making up the numbers, PROCAR allowed Holden to use the 7.0 litre, 427 cui GM LS6 V8 engine (as used successfully at Le Mans in the Chevrolet Corvette C5-R and C6-R's) instead of the 5.7 litre Gen III V8 as used in the Monaro CV8 road cars. This caused some controversy as it was felt that allowing Holden to use a larger engine than available in the road cars gave them an advantage over their rivals, with some fans feeling that this decision was a big factor in the eventual demise of the series. PROCAR's given reason was that it allowed the Monaro's to better compete with the V12 and V10 engine cars as well as the lighter V8 and H6 (flat-six) cars.

During practice for the PROCAR run 2002 Bathurst 24 Hour race, triple Nations Cup champion and seven time Bathurst 1000 winner Jim Richards labelled the Monaro as a "Better V8 Supercar" (even though its fastest time around the Mount Panorama Circuit would be some 7 seconds slower than a V8 Supercar at the time), while NC regular and veteran driver John Bowe said that while he had no problems racing against the car, he believed the 7.0 L Monaro was against the spirit of the rules.

Other cars that were eligible to race in Nations Cup, but rarely (if ever) did included the Mosler MT900R, BMW M3 GTR, Nissan Skyline R34 GT-R and Lotus Esprit.

Demise
With the demise of PROCAR during 2004, CAMS revived the Australian GT Championship in 2005 (the first time the championship was run in 20 years) and the series was merged into the grids of the Australian Porsche Drivers Challenge, itself a class of refugees left over after the Australian Carrera Cup Championship replaced the former Porsche Cup. The regulations differed and not all Nations Cup cars were eligible to race in the GT series, the controversial Holden Monaro 427C the most notable such example.

Championship results
The top three placegetters in these five championships were:

References

 CAMS Manual of Motor Sport, 2001 to 2006
 Official Program, Clipsal 500 Adelaide, 7–9 April 2000

 
Nations Cup
2000 establishments in Australia
2004 disestablishments in Australia
Sports leagues established in 2000